Nicolas Alvarado (born 19 June 1944) is a Panamanian basketball player. He competed in the men's tournament at the 1968 Summer Olympics.

References

1944 births
Living people
Panamanian men's basketball players
Olympic basketball players of Panama
Basketball players at the 1968 Summer Olympics
People from Darién Province